The Freiburg Declaration (Freiburger Erklärung in German) is a June 2012 letter signed by rebel priests from the Roman Catholic Archdiocese of Freiburg calling for change to Catholic law forbidding communion to remarried divorcees. The archbishop for Freiburg, Robert Zollitsch, expressed disapproval of practices contrary to church law and requested that priests refrain from signing the declaration, and to retract any signatures already made.

References

Marriage in the Catholic Church
Divorce
Catholic Church in Germany
History of Freiburg im Breisgau
Religious reformers by religion
2012 in Germany
2012 in Christianity
2012 documents